Springfield School District, also called Springfield Public Schools, is a public school district in Lane County, Oregon, United States.  It serves students in Springfield and outlying areas, including Goshen, Mohawk, and Walterville.

Schools
There are 20 schools in the Springfield School District.  Nearly 11,000 students attend schools in the district.

Elementary schools

Centennial
Douglas Gardens
Guy Lee
Maple
Mt. Vernon
Page
Ridgeview
Riverbend
Thurston
Two Rivers-Dos Rios
Walterville
Yolanda

Middle schools
Agnes Stewart
Briggs
Hamlin
Thurston

High schools
Academy of Arts and Academics
Gateways High School
Springfield High School
Thurston High School

See also
List of school districts in Oregon
Eugene School District, an adjacent district
Lane Education Service District

References

External links
 

School districts in Oregon
Education in Lane County, Oregon
Springfield, Oregon
1854 establishments in Oregon Territory
School districts established in 1854